Pat Comfort (born 1930) was an American politician in the state of Washington. He served in the Washington House of Representatives from 1961 to 1965 for district 26.

References

1930 births
Republican Party members of the Washington House of Representatives
Living people